Comox was a steamship built in 1891 in British Columbia which served until 1920. Comox was the first steel ship built on the west coast of North America north of San Francisco.

Design and construction
Comox was built in 1891. The components of the vessel were manufactured in Paisley, Scotland, and then shipped to Vancouver, British Columbia, where they were assembled by Henry Darling. When complete, Comox was 101 feet long, with a beam of 18 feet and 5-foot depth of hold. Overall size of the vessel was 101 gross tons. The hull was steel, and Comox was the first steel ship built on the Pacific coast north of San Francisco. As built, Comox could accommodate almost 200 passengers.

The power plant was a double-expansion steam engine, manufactured by Bow McLachlan & Co., Glasgow, Scotland. The engines had a high-pressure cylinder 12 inches in diameter, low-pressure of 24-inch diameter, and a stroke of 18 inches, and drove the ship at 11 miles per hour. Coal consumption was 4.5 tons in 24 hours.

Comox had an auxiliary sailing rig as a sloop.

Operation
Comox was completed in October 1891. After completion, Comox was placed on routes running north from Vancouver. Christ Dragoylovich (born 1857), a native of Austria, was the vessel's chief engineer. Comox ran to logging camps on week days, and was used for excursions on weekends. By 1909, Comox had made 2,000 trips out of Vancouver harbor.

Disposition
Comox was sold for scrap in 1919, but was not dismantled. Instead, the vessel was sold to Panama interests and transferred south, under the name Alejandro.

Notes

References 
 Newell, Gordon R., H.W. McCurdy Marine History of the Pacific Northwest, Superior Publishing, Seattle WA (1966).
 Wright, E.W., ed., Lewis and Dryden Marine History of the Pacific Northwest, Lewis & Dryden Publishing, Portland OR (1895)  page 467 (accessed June 18, 2011).

Further reading 
 Rushton, Gerald A., Whistle up the Inlet – The Union Steamship Story, J.J. Douglas (1974).

1891 ships
Steamships of Canada
Union Steamship Company of British Columbia